Yer-sub (Yar-Sub also Yer-Su or Yir-sub) are a category of nature spirits in the Tengriism. The name means "Earth–Water" in Turkic languages.

The word Yer-Sub had two meanings. One was the name of natural spirits, the other the visible world, the Native Land.

Spirits of Earth and Water
Tengrist people believe that Yer-sub spirits exist in trees, lakes, mountains, stones, and sometimes in a whole empire, and that Yer-sub spirits are the forgotten souls of ancestors. They think that, if the name of an ancestor is not mentioned any more, that ancestor's soul will become object in the nature.

Tengrists are required to be careful and respectful towards nature, so as not to disturb the Yer-sub spirits. They also must be thankful to them, when they take something from nature.

Demons and spirits served important functions in pre-industrial Turkic societies and were considered to be very interactive in the lives and domains of humans. Some spirits were benevolent and could be helpful in human tasks, others were harmful and often destructive. These spirits were also considered to be derived from ancestors or certain deceased humans. Such spirits could appear at will in various forms including that of different animals or human form. Some of these spirits could also participate in malevolent activity to harm humans, such as drowning humans, obstructing the harvest, or sucking the blood of livestock and sometimes humans. Hence, the Turkic peoples were obliged to appease these spirits to prevent the spirits from their potential for erratic and destructive behaviour.

Yar-Sub or Yer-Su is mentioned together with Gök-Tengri in the Orkhon Inscriptions, under the name Yduk (Turkish: Iduk, Idık "Sacred") Yar-Sub (Earth-Water). One of the records states: "Turkic Tengri and Turkic sacred Yer-Sub said in Heaven: "Let not the Turkic people vanish! Let them be a Nation!" The ancient Turkic people called the visible world occupied by their people Yar-Sub (Earth-Water) or Middle Earth, emphasising its central location.

Natural forces
In Turkic community, each boy (clan) and tribe had their territory, the boundaries of which outlined their world. This Yar-Sub (Land-Water or Earth-Aqua) was theirs, beyond which were others possessions. Their own limited Yer-Sub (Yer-Su) was not just a settled space but also a smaller version of the world. For each boy (clan), their land was the centre of the world and a focus of order and harmony. "Native land" was not only a geographical concept, but was also a space that could be emotionally perceived by man. It was the land of the Clan and of the Ata-Ana (Ancestors) and could never be sold or given away.

The dominant role in determining the fate of people and ulus (nations) belonged to Gök-Tengri, but natural forces yielded to Yar-Sub. Sometimes on Tengri's command, Yer-Sub punished people for their sins. But they are generally considered benevolent. To appease Yar-Sub, sacrifices were made every spring in preparation for the cattle-breeding season and before planting crops. With the disintegration of the ancient Turkic states, the rituals to Yer-Sub (Yer-Su) began to take on distinct local forms. As in ancient ages, they were conducted in the upper rivulets and on the shores of lakes. White rams were sacrificed and hung on a tree, under which a prayer was conducted. After the ritual, participants feasted and exchanged gifts.

External links 
 The Gods of Turks

Tengriism
Turkic deities
Turkic legendary creatures